Strathclyde (  in Gaelic, meaning "strath (valley) of the River Clyde") was one of nine former local government regions of Scotland created in 1975 by the Local Government (Scotland) Act 1973 and abolished in 1996 by the Local Government etc. (Scotland) Act 1994. The Strathclyde region had 19 districts. The region was named after the medieval Kingdom of Strathclyde but covered a broader geographic area than its namesake.

History
The Strathclyde region was created in 1975 under the Local Government (Scotland) Act 1973, which established a two-tier structure of local government across Scotland comprising upper-tier regions and lower-tier districts. Strathclyde covered the whole area of six counties and parts of another two, which were all abolished for local government purposes at the same time:
Argyll (except Ardnamurchan District and the electoral divisions of Ballachulish and Kinlochleven)
Ayrshire
Buteshire
Dunbartonshire
Glasgow
Lanarkshire
Renfrewshire
Stirlingshire (part, being the burgh of Kilsyth, Western No. 3 District, the electoral division of Kilsyth West, and the polling district of Kilsyth East (Banton))

The region was named after the ancient British or Brythonic Damnonii Kingdom of Strathclyde. The kingdom had broadly covered the southern part of the region created in 1975, with the Argyll and Buteshire parts of the region not having been within the ancient kingdom. Conversely, the kingdom had at times included areas further to the south which were not included in the region created in 1975, including Dumfries and Galloway and Cumbria.

Strathclyde Regional Council was responsible for education, social work, police, fire, sewage, strategic planning, roads, and transport. It employed almost 100,000 public servants, almost half of whom were teachers, lecturers and others in the education service.

Strathclyde region was abolished in 1996 under the Local Government etc. (Scotland) Act 1994 which replaced regions and districts with unitary council areas. The region was divided into twelve council areas: Argyll and Bute, East Ayrshire, East Dunbartonshire, East Renfrewshire, Glasgow City (created as City of Glasgow), Inverclyde, North Ayrshire, North Lanarkshire, Renfrewshire, South Ayrshire, South Lanarkshire, and West Dunbartonshire (created as Dumbarton and Clydebank)

Geography
The Strathclyde region was on the west coast of Scotland and stretched from the Highlands in the north to the Southern Uplands in the south. It included some of the Inner Hebrides in the north-west but also contained Scotland's largest urban area of Glasgow. As a local government region, its population, in excess of 2.5 million, was by far the largest of the regions and contained half of the population of Scotland.

Political control
Politics in the region were dominated by the Labour Party. The first regional council convener was the Reverend Geoff Shaw, who died in 1978. It was largely due to his leadership that the regional council forged its innovative strategy on multiple deprivation, which remained its central commitment to the end of the region's life through "Social Strategy for the Eighties" (1982) and "SS for the 90s".

The first election to Strathclyde Regional Council was held in 1974, initially operating as a shadow authority alongside the outgoing authorities until the new system came into force on 16 May 1975. Throughout the council's existence Labour held a majority of the seats:

Leadership
The council had two main leadership roles: a convener who acted as ceremonial head and presided at council meetings, and a leader of the council to provide political leadership.

Conveners

Leaders

Elections
Elections were held every four years.

District result maps

Premises

The council initially rented offices called Melrose House at 19 Cadogan Street in Glasgow to act as an interim headquarters pending a decision being taken on a permanent headquarters. Various other offices around the centre of Glasgow were also used for additional office space, notably on India Street. In 1976, the nearby former Glasgow High School buildings at 94 Elmbank Street were vacated. The council converted the former school buildings to become its headquarters, using the school's dining room block of 1897 to become a council chamber, whilst using the India Street offices as additional accommodation. The remodelled school and neighbouring offices were formally opened by Elizabeth II on 2 November 1979, when the whole complex of eleven buildings was collectively renamed "Strathclyde House".

After the council's abolition several of the modern office buildings which made up Strathclyde House were gradually sold off for redevelopment. The old High School buildings, which are category A listed buildings, were used by Glasgow City Council as additional office space. The council chamber there was briefly used in 2000 by the Scottish Parliament, whilst its new permanent home at Holyrood was under construction and the temporary buildings in Edinburgh were booked out. Glasgow City Council sold the old High School buildings in 2010 but a new use has yet to be found for them.

Emergency services 
Until April 2013, the area was also used as a police force area, covered by Strathclyde Police, and a fire service area, covered by Strathclyde Fire and Rescue Service. Both have now been replaced by single services (Police Scotland and Scottish Fire and Rescue Service).

Transport 
The name is still in use as a transport area, covered by Strathclyde Partnership for Transport. The area covered by SPT however is smaller than the region, as most of Argyll and Bute lies outside its remit.

Sub-regions and districts 
Except for Argyll and Bute and the City of Glasgow, the 19 districts were grouped to form 'sub-regions' or 'divisions', each named after a historic county. The Argyll and Bute district and the City of Glasgow district were sub-regions in their own right, and Argyll and Bute was named after two counties.

Successor Council Areas

See also 
Glasgow (European Parliament constituency)
Strathclyde East (European Parliament constituency)
Strathclyde West (European Parliament constituency)
Strathclyde Park, in Motherwell, created during the era
University of Strathclyde, in Glasgow

References

External links

Regions of Scotland
1996 disestablishments in Scotland
1975 establishments in Scotland

sv:Strathclyde